Radosveta Teneva (born ) is a Bulgarian female volleyball player, who played as a wing spiker.

She was part of the Bulgaria women's national volleyball team at the 2002 FIVB Volleyball Women's World Championship in Germany. 
She also played at the 2007 Women's European Volleyball Championship, and 2009 Women's European Volleyball Championship.
On club level she played for Olympiacos.

References

External links
profile at greekvolley.gr

1980 births
Living people
Bulgarian women's volleyball players
Olympiacos Women's Volleyball players
Place of birth missing (living people)
Wing spikers